Dharmpur Himachal railway station is a small railway station in Solan district in the Indian state of Himachal Pradesh. The station lies on UNESCO World Heritage Site Kalka–Shimla Railway. It was allotted the railway code of DMP under the jurisdiction of Ambala railway division. The  narrow-gauge Kalka–Shimla Railway was constructed by Delhi–Ambala–Kalka Railway Company and opened for traffic in 1903. In 1905 the line was regauged to  gauge.

Trains 
 Kalka Shimla NG Passenger
 Kalka Shimla Rail Motor
 Shivalik Deluxe Express
 Himalayan Queen
 Shimla Kalka Passenger

References

Railway stations in Solan district
Ambala railway division
Mountain railways in India

British-era buildings in Himachal Pradesh